Sergio de Castro Spikula (born January 25, 1930) is a Chilean economist who served the military junta headed by Augusto Pinochet as economy and finance minister. De Castro was one of the Chicago boys, trained in economics at the University of Chicago. Sergio de Castro is one of the authors of the influential text known as El ladrillo, writing its prologue.

See also
Crisis of 1982

References

1930 births
Living people
Ministers of the military dictatorship of Chile (1973–1990)
20th-century Chilean economists
Chilean anti-communists
Chilean Ministers of Finance
Chilean Ministers of Economy
People from Santiago
University of Chicago alumni
Pontifical Catholic University of Chile alumni
Member of the Mont Pelerin Society